Jean Carlos Cedeño Preciado (born 7 September 1985) is a Panamanian footballer who currently plays for Árabe Unido.

Club career
Cedeño played for Chorrillo before moving abroad to play alongside compatriots Alcibiades Rojas and Rolando Blackburn at Guatemalan side Juventud Retalteca. Back in Panama he played for Chorrillo and Alianza.

He joined Árabe Unido in January 2014.

International career
He made his debut for Panama in a December 2010 friendly match against Honduras and has, as of May 2015, earned a total of 20 caps, scoring no goals. He represented his country in 4 FIFA World Cup qualification matches and played at the 2011 and 2013 Copa Centroamericana as well as at the 2013 CONCACAF Gold Cup.

References

External links
 
 National team profile – FEPAFUT

1985 births
Living people
Association football defenders
Panamanian footballers
Panama international footballers
2011 Copa Centroamericana players
2013 Copa Centroamericana players
2013 CONCACAF Gold Cup players
Unión Deportivo Universitario players
Alianza F.C. footballers
C.D. Árabe Unido players
Panamanian expatriate footballers
Expatriate footballers in Guatemala